David Lamar Little, Sr. (January 3, 1959 – March 17, 2005) was an American college and professional football player who was a linebacker in the National Football League (NFL) for twelve seasons during the 1980s and early 1990s.  Little played college football for the University of Florida, and was recognized as an All-American.  Selected late in the seventh round of the 1981 NFL Draft, he played professionally for the NFL's Pittsburgh Steelers and became a nine-season starter.

Early life 

Little was born in Miami, Florida, in 1959.  He attended Andrew Jackson High School in Miami, and was a standout high school football player for the Jackson Generals.

College career 

Little accepted an athletic scholarship to attend the University of Florida in Gainesville, Florida, where he played linebacker for coach Doug Dickey and coach Charley Pell's Florida Gators football teams from 1977 to 1980.  As a senior team captain in 1980, he helped lead the Gators in the biggest one-year turnaround in the history of NCAA Division I football—from 0–10–1 in 1979 to an 8–4 bowl team in 1980.  After the 1980 season, he was a first-team All-Southeastern Conference (SEC) selection, a consensus first-team All-American, and the recipient of the Gators' Fergie Ferguson Award recognizing the "senior football player who displays outstanding leadership, character and courage."  He finished his four-year college career with 475 tackles—still the Gators' all-time career record.

Little was inducted into the University of Florida Athletic Hall of Fame as a "Gator Great" in 1991.  In one of a series of articles published by The Gainesville Sun in 2006, the Sun sportswriters picked him as No. 18 among the 100 all-time greatest Gator players from the first century of Florida football.

Professional career 

He was a middle linebacker for the team, at one point starting eighty-nine games in a row. He was selected to the Pro Bowl after the  season. In his twelve-season NFL career, Little appeared in 179 games, started 125 of them, and totaled ten interceptions and eleven recovered fumbles.

Accidental death 

Little died on March 17, 2005, as the result of a weight-lifting accident; he was 46 years old. Little suffered from heart disease and experienced a cardiac flutter while lifting weights at his Miami home; he dropped  of weights on his chest, which rolled onto his neck and suffocated him.

Little was survived by his wife Denise, their two sons and daughter, his mother, and his older brother, Pro Football Hall of Fame member Larry Little, an All-Pro guard for the Miami Dolphins.

See also 

 1980 College Football All-America Team
 Florida Gators football, 1970–79
 Florida Gators football, 1980–89
 List of Florida Gators football All-Americans
 List of Florida Gators in the NFL Draft
 List of Pittsburgh Steelers players
 List of University of Florida alumni
 List of University of Florida Athletic Hall of Fame members

References

Bibliography 

 Carlson, Norm, University of Florida Football Vault: The History of the Florida Gators, Whitman Publishing, LLC, Atlanta, Georgia (2007).  .
 Golenbock, Peter, Go Gators!  An Oral History of Florida's Pursuit of Gridiron Glory, Legends Publishing, LLC, St. Petersburg, Florida (2002).  .
 Hairston, Jack, Tales from the Gator Swamp: A Collection of the Greatest Gator Stories Ever Told, Sports Publishing, LLC, Champaign, Illinois (2002).  .
 McCarthy, Kevin M.,  Fightin' Gators: A History of University of Florida Football, Arcadia Publishing, Mount Pleasant, South Carolina (2000).  .
 Nash, Noel, ed., The Gainesville Sun Presents The Greatest Moments in Florida Gators Football, Sports Publishing, Inc., Champaign, Illinois (1998).  .

1959 births
2005 deaths
Accidental deaths in Florida
All-American college football players
American Conference Pro Bowl players
American football linebackers
Florida Gators football players
Pittsburgh Steelers players
Players of American football from Miami
Miami Jackson Senior High School alumni